Bosak is a Polish surname. It may refer to:

 Aleksander Bosak (born 1993), Polish racing driver
 Bogusław Bosak (born 1968), Polish politician
 Emanuel Bosák (1924–2011), Czech physical educationalist
 Hauke-Bosak, a notable German-Polish family
 John Bosak (1922–1994), American professional basketball player
 Jon Bosak (1924–2011), American engineer
 Józef Hauke-Bosak (1834–1871), Polish general
 Krzysztof Bosak (born 1982), Polish politician
 Marcin Bosak (born 1979), Polish actor
 Meir Bosak (1912–1992), Polish-Israeli writer
 Tanja Bosak, Croatian-American experimental geobiologist

See also
 Allan Boesak (born 1946), South African Dutch Reformed Church cleric
 Leonard Bosack (born 1952), co-founder of Cisco Systems
 Rudy Bozak (born 1982), American acoustics engineer
 Tyler Bozak (born 1986), Canadian professional ice hockey player